XHSW-FM is a radio station on 94.9 FM in Cuernavaca, Morelos. It is owned by Radiorama and known as La Más Picuda with a grupera format.

History
XHSW received its concession on June 15, 1981. It was owned by Elvira Paz Cisneros until 2002.

References

Spanish-language radio stations
Radio stations in Morelos